Pubistylus is a genus of flowering plants belonging to the family Rubiaceae.

Its native range is Andaman and Nicobar Islands.

Species:
 Pubistylus andamanensis Thoth.

References

Rubiaceae
Rubiaceae genera